Halit Akçatepe (1 January 1938 – 31 March 2017) was a Turkish actor.

Life and career 
Akçatepe  was born in Üsküdar in 1938, the son of Sitki Akçatepe. In 1943, he made his debut in the film Dertli Pınar at the age of 5 and made more appearances in other films in some child roles. Akçatepe completed his studies in Saint Benoit French High School. In 1956 he joined the army and stayed there for 1,5 years before returning to acting.

In 1975, he acted in Hababam Sınıfı and then later its sequels  Hababam Sınıfı Sınıfta Kaldı, Hababam Sınıfı Dokuz Doğuruyor and Hababam Sınıfı Tatilde.

He died of a heart attack caused by respiratory failure in 2017.

References

External links
 

1938 births
2017 deaths
Turkish male film actors
Turkish male television actors
Male actors from Istanbul
Turkish male child actors
Golden Orange Life Achievement Award winners
People from Üsküdar
Respiratory disease deaths in Turkey
Deaths from respiratory failure
Burials at Karacaahmet Cemetery